John Pratt (born 26 June 1948) is an English former professional footballer who played as a midfielder. He spent much of his career at Tottenham Hotspur.

Tottenham Hotspur career 
Pratt was born in Hackney, London. He signed for the club as a junior in November, 1965. He made his debut in April 1969 against Arsenal. Making 415 appearances and scoring 49 goals in all competitions in 11 seasons at the club. He always gave 100% in his midfield duties but was often made the scapegoat when Spurs performed poorly, and never quite winning over certain sections of the White Hart Lane crowd. In his career at Spurs he played in every outfield position. He played as a substitute in the first leg as Tottenham won the 1972 UEFA Cup Final, and also started the 1973 League Cup Final. However, in the latter game he got injured and was substituted off for Ralph Coates who went on to score the winning goal.

Bill Nicholson quote

Later career 
He joined Portland Timbers in the North American Soccer League (NASL) in 1980 and stayed for three seasons in the USA.

After returning to Spurs he went on to coach the youth and junior sides before being promoted assistant manager to Peter Shreeves till 1986.

Today 
He runs a window cleaning company and has gone into partnership with ex–Spur Mark Falco in an asbestos clearing concern. Pratt was a regular for the clubs Old Boys XI. Since a knee and ankle injury his duties at the club are restricted to working in hospitality and as an unofficial team coach.

Honours 
Tottenham Hotspur
 UEFA Cup: 1972; runner-up 1974
 Football League Cup: 1973

References

External links 
 John Pratt shrine
 Cup final teams
 Pen- picture of John
 Fact- file and photos of John
 Career details
 NASL stats

Living people
1948 births
English footballers
Footballers from the London Borough of Hackney
Association football midfielders
UEFA Cup winning players
English Football League players
North American Soccer League (1968–1984) indoor players
North American Soccer League (1968–1984) players
Tottenham Hotspur F.C. players
Portland Timbers (1975–1982) players
English expatriate footballers
English expatriate sportspeople in the United States
Expatriate soccer players in the United States